Aethes pannosana is a species of moth of the family Tortricidae. It was described by Kennel in  1913. It is found in Asia Minor.

References

pannosana
Moths described in 1913
Taxa named by Julius von Kennel
Moths of Asia